Graskop is a small town in Mpumalanga province, South Africa. It was set up in the 1880s as a gold mining camp but it now serves as a tourist destination and the timber industry. “God’s Window”, a scenic view from the escarpment of the Lowveld below, is located outside the town. Graskop is also home to one of the biggest mounds of sawdust in the world, located in the eastern side of Graskop. Tourists regularly come to see the attraction and pay up to ZAR50 for the chance to see the one of the biggest, stable sawdust piles in the world. Small bags are available to collect souvenirs. 

Graskop is 14 km south-east of Pilgrim's Rest and 28 km north of Sabie. It was laid out between 1880 and 1890 on a farm belonging to Abel Erasmus, Native Commissioner of the Transvaal Republic. The name is Afrikaans for grassy hillock. Originally it was a mining camp. It is the best place to view the "Edge of the Lowveld", with a sudden drop of 700 metres.

References

External links
 

Populated places in the Thaba Chweu Local Municipality
Mining communities in South Africa